David Murray Shepherd (born 1973) is a Canadian politician who was elected in the 2015 Alberta general election to the Legislative Assembly of Alberta to represent the electoral district of Edmonton-Centre, and re-elected in the 2019 Alberta general election to represent its successor district, Edmonton-City Centre.

Personal life
Shepherd has a Bachelors of Arts in Professional Communications from Royal Roads University where he received the Chancellor's award in 2014. He also has a diploma in music performance and live sound recording from MacEwan University. Shepherd worked in a variety of jobs such as taxpayer service agent, salesperson, musician and studio engineer.

Before being elected Shepherd worked in the Communications field as an advisor and writer for North Edge Business Association, the city of Edmonton and the government of Alberta.

Shepherd is an avid cyclist and has volunteered for the Edmonton Bike Coalition as a spokesperson and organizer.

Electoral history

2019 general election

2015 general election

References

1970s births
Alberta New Democratic Party MLAs
Living people
Politicians from Edmonton
Black Canadian politicians
21st-century Canadian politicians